Podiuming is a slang term for the action of finishing a contest within the first three places. It is often used during sporting event television broadcasting, especially Olympic Games coverage. The term is commonly heard at Athletics events, bicycling races, marathons and other large-entrant number events. It is also commonly found on various social media posts by users of all backgrounds.

Controversy
Podiuming is not an officially recognized word in the English language. Many people do not even recognize the term as slang, but the words of ignorance. Even the use of the word podium as a verb instead of noun is controversial. The New York Times wrote on the very subject of the correct use of the word podium during its Winter Olympic coverage in 2010.

Newspapers and magazines are not above using the term to develop headlines or other "hooks" in writing.

References

Slang
Sports terminology